The Arms of Krupp (1968) is William Manchester's history of the Krupp family, which owned a dominant armaments manufacturing company based in Essen, Germany.

Synopsis

The book presents readable and often humorous descriptions of the Krupp family and its businesses from the Thirty Years' War to the Kaisers, the Weimar Republic, the Nazis, the American occupation, and finally the Bonn government. The book describes how  the family and its business received generally favorable treatment from the government, culminating in a special law Lex Krupp.  Manchester's book describes family members in detail from the first Krupp (circa 1500) "a shrewd chandler with a keen eye for the main chance," through the family's incarnation by the sixth generation as "Essen's uncrowned kings," to the powerful weapons company that armed Germany for three major wars, and finally the dissolution of the business. Manchester biases his story; he describes every member as having some unfortunate trait, and all as somewhat malevolent.

The book examines to what extent German industry has part of the moral responsibility for the acts of the German state during the World War II. Krupp profited directly from requisitions of industrial capacities in occupied Europe. The Nazi war effort created a huge demand for workers in the armament industry; a mobilization of women into the labor force was ruled out due to ideological reasons. Instead the Nazis opted to meet the demand for workers by slave laborers. The Krupp AG owned private concentration camps and leased slaves from the SS at the cost of one Reichsmark per day; Slaves for the industry were transferred directly from extermination camps or from POWs, were drafted during the Nacht und Nebel program, or civilians recruited from occupied countries as ostarbeiters. The surviving former slaves were not compensated adequately after the war for their sufferings; after the war Alfried Krupp was convicted of crimes against humanity

Critical response 
Time Magazine gave the book a mixed review stating: 
The result is an often flawed, some times naive but largely fascinating chronicle whose inflated pretensions as a work of real scholarship are punctured by swarms of errors. As a work of history, the book is marred, too, by an overwrought style and an unbecomingly snide use of irony. Manchester is not fond of the Germans, and he caricatures them either as superefficient and slavishly obedient or as a folk barely removed from dwarfs and dragons, blood feuds and bags of tainted gold.

References

1968 non-fiction books
Books about the military–industrial complex
English-language books
History books about Germany
Krupp
Little, Brown and Company books